is the 22nd single by Japanese singer/songwriter Chisato Moritaka. Written by Moritaka and Kenichi Kurosawa, the single was released by One Up Music on January 31, 1994. The song was used by Asahi Breweries for commercials promoting Asahi Z beer.

The song was included in the 2020 various artists album .

Music video 
The music video takes place at a restaurant, with Moritaka singing by her table before all of the customers and staff dance with her. The video introduced the "Kibun Sōkai dance", with Moritaka directing the audience to wave their arms right to left to the chorus.

The music video LaserDisc was released on November 30, 1994, with its contents compiled in the 2000 DVD Chisato Moritaka DVD Collection No. 9: Kibun Sōkai.

Chart performance 
"Kibun Sōkai" peaked at No. 3 on Oricon's singles chart and sold 438,000 copies. It was also certified Platinum by the RIAJ.

Other versions 
Moritaka re-recorded the song and uploaded the video on her YouTube channel on August 3, 2013. This version is also included in Moritaka's 2014 self-covers DVD album Love Vol. 5. It was also used in a 2015 Asahi Style Free beer commercial starring Moritaka.

The song was remixed by tofubeats in the 2014 collaboration album Chisato Moritaka with tofubeats: Moritaka Tofu.

Track listing

Personnel 
 Chisato Moritaka – vocals, drums
 Yuichi Takahashi – guitar, piano, backing vocals
 Hiroyoshi Matsuo – acoustic guitar
 Shin Hashimoto – piano
 Masafumi Yokoyama – bass
 Yukio Seto – bass

Chart positions

Certification

Cover versions 
 Yumi Adachi covered the song on her 1995 album Big.
 Shōko Hamada covered the song on her 2007 cover album Hamashō Album ~O teate Shimashōko~.
 Runa Miyashida covered the song on her 2009 album Ska Flavor No. 2.
 Azumi Waki covered the song on the 2016 soundtrack album The Idolm@ster Cinderella Master Jewelries! 003.

References

External links 
  (Single)
  (Video)
 
 

1994 singles
1994 songs
1994 video albums
Japanese-language songs
Chisato Moritaka songs
Songs with lyrics by Chisato Moritaka
One Up Music singles